The Couches de Chailley is a geologic formation in France. It preserves fossils dating back to the Jurassic period.

See also

 List of fossiliferous stratigraphic units in France
 Geologic time scale

References
 
 Sample Locations and Sample Fossils found in Couches de Chailley

Jurassic France